Julia Butters (born ) is an American teenage actress. She received critical acclaim for her role as Trudi Fraser in Quentin Tarantino's Once Upon a Time in Hollywood and as Reggie Fabelman in Steven Spielberg's The Fabelmans (2022). From 2016 to 2020, she starred as Anna-Kat Otto on ABC's sitcom American Housewife.

Early life
Butters was born in Los Angeles, California, to parents Lorelei and Darrin; her father is a Disney animator who has worked on films such as Frozen and Ralph Breaks the Internet.

Career
Butters began her career at the age of two doing commercials. Her first speaking role was the role of Gabby in a Criminal Minds episode of the same name. In 2016, Butters portrayed the recurring role of Ella in the Amazon Prime Video series Transparent for eight episodes. Later that year, she began starring in the ABC sitcom American Housewife as Anna-Kat Otto.

When Quentin Tarantino was writing the script of his ninth film Once Upon a Time in Hollywood, he spotted Butters on television, and later cast her in the role of precocious child actress Trudi Fraser. After she received critical acclaim for this role, Butters and her management team decided to pursue similar opportunities for her, leading her to leave American Housewife after four seasons, being replaced by former Life in Pieces star Giselle Eisenberg.

In December 2020, Butters was cast in Netflix’s The Gray Man. In June 2021, it was announced that Butters was cast in The Fabelmans, Steven Spielberg's upcoming semi-autobiographical coming-of-age film as Reggie Fabelman, a character based on Spielberg's sister. In August 2022, Butters was cast as twin sibling Lily in the upcoming horror film Queen of Bones.

Filmography

Film

Television

Awards and nominations

References

External links

2000s births
Year of birth missing (living people)
Living people
21st-century American actresses
Actresses from Los Angeles
American child actresses
American film actresses
People from Glendale, California